Shadows of Silence is a Tamil short film directed by Pradeepan Raveendran.

Cast
 Krishna Subramania
 Unitha Ananthakumar
 Krishanthi Ananthakumar
 Kajith Karunagaran
 Kalvin Karunagaran

Festivals and awards
 Cannes International Film Festival - Directors Fortnight – France
 Chicago International Film Festival – USA
 Raindance International Film Festival - London – UK 
 Encounters International Film Festival - Bristol – UK
 Kerala International Film Festival – India 
 Taipei Golden Horse Film Festival – Taiwan 
 World Film Festival of Bangkok – Thailand 
 South Asian International Film Festival - New York – USA 
 Cork International Film Festival – Ireland
 Jakarta International Film Festival – Indonesia 
 Dubai International Film Festival – UAE 
 International Film Festival of Rotterdam – Netherland 
 Festival du Court Métrage de Clermont-Ferrand – France (Mention Spéciale du Jury) 
 Glasgow International Short Film Festival – Scotland

References

External links
EXIL IMAGE
Shadows of Silence-Unifrance